Qatar Tijan an Nur International Quran Competition and Award is an International Quranic competition and award organized by Jeem Television (Al Jazeera Children's Channel) in Qatar. Children aged only 9-13 can participate in this program. The competition has attracted participants from different countries, turning it into one of the most important Quran recitation competitions in the world. The event hosts Quran recitation competitions in various ways. The contest aims to communicate and instill supreme and moral values in children, while promoting the correct use of classical Arabic and encouraging children to study and recite the Qur’an. A committee consisting of eminent scholars, and scholars specializing in the study and recitation of the Qur'an will evaluate the readers based on the rules of vowels, the quality of words and performance and the type of recitation.

In this competition, First place winner get 500,000 Qatari riyal, the second place and third-place winners get 300,000 Qatari riyal and 100,000 Qatari riyal respectively.

History 
In 2013, more than 1,300 children from 54 countries applied to participate in the event. 13 year old Doha from Morocco was winner in this session.

In 2022, Quran memorizers from 48 countries were attracted, while 16 Arab countries participated with 681 reciters. And Ministry of Awqaf and Islamic Affairs will sponsor in this 2022 edition for Quran Recitation.

Purpose 
The purpose of this award is to serve the Qur'an of Allah and to improve the general level of efficiency of the Qur'an through the following activities.

 To inspire the children generation towards their religion and realize their duty towards their Islamic beliefs and goals.
 Respecting significant memorizers of the Qur'an.
 Presenting one's country to the Muslim world in the service of Islam.

See More 

 Sheikh Jassim bin Mohammed Al Thani National Holy Quran Competition
 Dubai International Holy Quran Award
 Muhammad VI Awards for the Holy Quran
 Islamic Republic of Iran's International Holy Quran Competition

References

External links 
 Official Competition link

Islam in Qatar
Quran reciting
Annual events in Qatar
Quranic studies
Islamic awards